Volsk is a town in Saratov Oblast, Russia, located on the right bank of the Volga River, opposite the mouth of the Bolshoy Irgiz (a tributary of the Volga),  northeast from Saratov, the administrative center of the oblast. As of the 2010 Census, its population was 66,508.

History
It was founded in 1699 as the sloboda of Malykovka and was granted town status and renamed Volgsk in 1780. In the 19th century, the name gradually changed to a more pronounceable "Volsk". After the October Revolution of 1917, Volsk became a major center of cement production.

Administrative and municipal status
Within the framework of administrative divisions, Volsk serves as the administrative center of Volsky District, even though it is not a part of it. As an administrative division, it is, together with the work settlement of Kleny and three rural localities, incorporated separately as the town of oblast significance of Volsk—an administrative unit with the status equal to that of the districts. As a municipal division, the town of oblast significance of Volsk is incorporated within Volsky Municipal District as Volsk Urban Settlement.

See also
Tomka gas test site

References

Notes

Sources

External links
Wolsk.ru, unofficial website of Volsk 

Cities and towns in Saratov Oblast
Volsky Uyezd
Populated places established in 1699
Populated places on the Volga
1699 establishments in Russia